Ctenomys yatesi, also called Yates' tuco-tuco, is a species of tuco-tuco native to Bolivia. It was named after Terry Yates, a former curator at the University of New Mexico.

References

Tuco-tucos
Mammals of Bolivia
Endemic fauna of Bolivia
Mammals described in 2014